Vincent Rennie (born 7 June 1994) is a Cook Islands international rugby league footballer who plays as a  for the Newtown Jets in the NSW Cup.

He previously played for the Newcastle Thunder in Championship 1 and League 1 between 2015 and 2018.

Background
Rennie was born in Auckland, New Zealand. He is of Cook Islands descent. His brother Reubenn Rennie is a fellow Cook Islands international.

Playing career

Club career
Rennie played for the Melbourne Storm-Cronulla-Sutherland Sharks joint team in 2014.

He played for the Canterbury-Bankstown Bulldogs and the Auburn Warriors in 2015.

Rennie played for the Newcastle Thunder in Championship 1 and League 1 between 2015 and 2018.

He played for the Mount Pritchard Mounties between 2019 and 2021.

Rennie joined the Newtown Jets ahead of the 2022 NSW Cup season.

International career
Rennie made his international debut for the Cook Islands in October 2015 against Tonga.

In 2022 he was named in the Cook Islands squad for the 2021 Rugby League World Cup.

References

External links
Newtown Jets profile
Cook Islands profile

1994 births
Living people
Auburn Warriors players
Cook Islands national rugby league team players
Mount Pritchard Mounties players
New Zealand rugby league players
New Zealand sportspeople of Cook Island descent
Newcastle Thunder players
Newtown Jets players
Rugby league players from Auckland
Rugby league props